Perry Digweed (born 26 October 1959) is an English former professional footballer who played as a goalkeeper for Fulham, Brighton & Hove Albion, Chelsea, Wimbledon and Watford, making 226 appearances in the Football League.

After retiring from football, Digweed went on to appear alongside Vinnie Jones in the film Mean Machine.

References

External links

1959 births
Living people
English footballers
Association football goalkeepers
Footballers from Westminster
Fulham F.C. players
Brighton & Hove Albion F.C. players
Chelsea F.C. players
Wimbledon F.C. players
Watford F.C. players
English Football League players